Marvis Lynn Martin is an American operatic soprano, best known for her concert performances and recitals, including her renditions of Joseph Canteloube's Songs from the Auvergne, and of Bess in Bobby McFerrin's touring concert version of Porgy and Bess.

Hailed as "a lyric soprano of unusual brightness, evenness and quality" by The New York Times and winner of several competition prizes, Martin is acclaimed for her "beauty of voice and sensitive communication, receiving awards, medals and glowing reviews as a song recitalist, concert singer, and opera performer."

Early life and education 
Martin was born in Tallahassee, Florida but grew up in Miami, where she was singing professionally by the age of five. She trained at the University of Miami's Frost School of Music, earning a Bachelor of Music degree, in 1977. She subsequently obtained a master's degree from the Manhattan School of Music. She then studied under Elisabeth Schwarzkopf and was also a protégée of Alice Tully.

Career 
Martin made her professional debut in 1981 as part of the Young Concert Artists Series; the New York Times review called her "promising" and said that "at her best she displayed a talent and a temperament that could make her into an important singer." She had her debut with the Metropolitan Opera in 1982, singing the role of "Pamina" in a touring production of The Magic Flute. Over the next few years, she received "awards, medals and glowing reviews as a song recitalist, concert singer and opera performer." At the Met, she performed in such operas as Boris Godunov, Don Carlo, Ariadne auf Naxos, Porgy and Bess, and Idomeneo.

As her career matured, she spent more time focusing on recitals and concert performances than on opera, claiming, "I love opera, but don't necessarily love all the hubbub." She has also slowed down her touring pace, saying, "I don't think that's a healthy way of life [...] I love going to the next city, but my jobs are spread out nicely." She has performed with numerous orchestras, including the Boston Symphony Orchestra and the New York Philharmonic, where music director and principal conductor, Zubin Mehta, programmed a piece for her.

Martin has said she especially enjoys returning to Florida for performances. In 1987, she was named the "Distinguished Alumni" honoree by the Frost School of Music at the University of Miami. In 1988, she was awarded the "Florida Prize," a $10,000 award given by The New York Times Company "to a Florida native or resident for outstanding work in the visual and performing arts."

Honors and awards 
 Florida Prize. New York Times Company, regional newspaper group, 1988
 Distinguished Alumna. Frost School of Music. University of Miami, 1987
 Michaels Award of Young Concert Artists. Alice Tully Hall, Lincoln Center. New York NY, 1981

References

External links 
 Marvin Martin. University of Miami. Frost School of Music. 1987 Distinguished Alumna
 Marvis Martin. The Metropolitan Opera
 
 Marvis Martin. Broadwayworld.com

1956 births
21st-century African-American women singers
21st-century American women opera singers
Musicians from Miami
University of Miami Frost School of Music alumni
Manhattan School of Music alumni
American operatic sopranos
Living people
Musicians from Tallahassee, Florida
Singers from Florida
20th-century African-American women singers
20th-century American women opera singers
African-American women opera singers